Lyulkovo is a rural locality (a village) in Zelentsovskoye Rural Settlement, Nikolsky District, Vologda Oblast, Russia. The population was 190 as of 2002.

Geography 
Lyulkovo is located 57 km northwest of Nikolsk (the district's administrative centre) by road. Sluda is the nearest rural locality.

References 

Rural localities in Nikolsky District, Vologda Oblast